Lorraine Fitzhugh (born December 17, 1963) is an English-born American former soccer player who played as a defender, making one appearance for the United States women's national team.

Career
During her college career, Fitzhugh played for the Washington Huskies. Between 1985 and 1987, she trained with the U.S. National program in the Western Regional team. She later went on to play for a Seattle-based club which won an over-30 national championship.

Fitzhugh made her only international appearance for the United States on July 9, 1986 against Canada in a play-off for the 1986 North American Cup title (a friendly tournament). The match, which lasted 30 minutes, was won by the U.S 3–0 to win the tournament.

In 2004, Fitzhugh coached the boys' junior varsity team of the Douglas High School Tigers in Minden, Nevada. A year later, she became the head coach of the girls' soccer program, leading the team to two state titles before stepping down in 2013.

Personal life
Fitzhugh was born in Portsmouth to English parents Rita Ann and Bryan Figgins. She married Edward Russell "Ed" Fitzhugh on August 17, 1991, in King County, Washington. In 1999, she and her husband moved to Douglas County, Nevada with their two sons. She teaches mathematics at Douglas High School.

Career statistics

International

Honors
United States
 1986 North American Cup

References

1963 births
Living people
Footballers from Portsmouth
American women's soccer players
American women's soccer coaches
Schoolteachers from Nevada
American women educators
American people of English descent
United States women's international soccer players
Women's association football defenders
Washington Huskies women's soccer players